In snakes, the ventral scales or gastrosteges are the enlarged and transversely elongated scales that extend down the underside of the body from the neck to the anal scale. When counting them, the first is the anteriormost ventral scale that contacts the paraventral (lowermost) row of dorsal scales on either side. The anal scale is not counted.

Related scales
 Preventral scales
 Anal scale
 Subcaudal scales
 Paraventral scales

See also
 Snake scale

References

Snake scales